The Toyota 88C-V was a Group C sports prototype entered by Toyota in 1988. It is the successor to the Toyota 88C and the predecessor to the Toyota 89C-V. Like other Toyota-powered sports prototypes of the era, it was designed and built by Dome. The car was a new design, developed around the Toyota's R32V  turbocharged V8 engine, which replaced the 88C's standard turbocharged Inline-4. The 88C-V competed in the All Japan Sports Prototype Championship.

Racing history

All Japan Sports Prototype Championship
The 88C-V made its debut at the 1988 Fuji 500 miles with a single car entered for Geoff Lees, Masanori Sekiya and Keiichi Suzuki but wasn't able to finish the race due to mechanical problems.

World Sports-Prototype Championship
Two 88C-Vs participated in the Japanese round of the World Sports-Prototype Championship, counting also as last round of the 1988 JSPC. The 1000 km of Fuji allowed Toyota another chance to compete against European competitors since Le Mans. The two cars were able to finish but were the last cars classified.

References

Group C cars
88C-V